V. R. Sunil Kumar is a member of 14th and 15th Kerala Legislative Assembly. He represents Kodungallur constituency and belongs to Communist Party of India. He is the son of V. K. Rajan, a four time member of Kerala Legislative assembly and the former minister of Agriculture.

Personal life 
V. R. Sunil Kumar was born as son of V.K. Rajan (Ex. Minister) and K.K. Sathy on 10 March 1969 at Kodungallur, Thrissur district. He is married to Sreebha R and the couple have two sons.

Education 
He holds B.A. and LL.B.

Political career 
He was Secretary Mandalam Committee and Member, State Council, AISF, AIYF, AITUC; Kodungalloor Mandalam Committee Secretary and District Committee Member, C.P.I.

References

Living people
1969 births
Kerala MLAs 2016–2021
Politicians from Thrissur
Communist Party of India politicians from Kerala